Round tower may refer to:

Types of tower
 A type of fortified tower with a circular floor plan
 Irish round tower, a type of early mediaeval stone tower
 Broch, a type of Iron Age drystone structure found in Scotland
 Round-tower church, a type of church found mainly in England
 Nuraghe, a type of megalithic edifice found in Sardinia, Italy
 Punic-Roman round towers, Malta

Specific towers
 Nantyglo Round Towers, South Wales
 Newport Tower (Rhode Island), also known as Round Tower
 Rundetårn (meaning "Round Tower"), Copenhagen, Denmark
 Round Tower Lodge, Sandiway, Cheshire, England
 Round Tower (Portsmouth), a fortification built to guard the entrance to Portsmouth Harbour
 Round Tower (Vyborg), a fortification in Vyborg, Russia
 Monument tat-Tromba, a water tower in Ħamrun, Malta also known as the Round Tower

Other uses
Round Towers GAA Clondalkin, a Gaelic Athletic Association club based in Dublin, Ireland
Round Towers GAA (Kildare), a Gaelic Athletic Association club based in Kildare Town, Ireland